Meena Menon (Mīnā Mēnana) is an Indian voice-dubbing artist and trained singer who speaks English and Hindi as her mother-tongue languages. She currently works at Sugar Mediaz, which is an Indian dubbing studio, for Hindi dubs of foreign productions, and she mainly uses the Hindi language method majorly to perform dubbing roles for foreign productions in India, throughout the studio's run.

Dubbing career
Meena Menon was five-years-old, when she started through Allahbad Radio, which is a station at Allahbad. She was a trained classical singer. She sang many songs in which they really liked her talent and wanted her to conduct programs that are aimed for kids in which there were also poetry, songs, etc. She even did dubbing roles for foreign theater films along with her studies. As she got older, she used to modulate her voice and talk to people in kids’ voices. Pretty soon, she came to know about dubbing and started it eventually at Sugar Mediaz. Her Hindi dubbing roles for foreign animation started and she tried more and more voice roles and came out doing well with even dubbing teenage and kids voices of male characters in Hindi.

Dubbing roles

Animated series

Live action films

See also
Dubbing (filmmaking)
List of Indian Dubbing Artists

References

Year of birth missing (living people)
Place of birth missing (living people)
Living people
Actresses from Mumbai
21st-century Indian women singers
21st-century Indian singers
Indian voice actresses
Singers from Mumbai
Actresses in Hindi television
21st-century Indian actresses
Women musicians from Maharashtra